The Texas Administrative Code is a subject-based compilation of all rules and regulations promulgated by Texas state agencies. The Code was originally created by legislation in 1977 with the passage of Administrative Code Act. In 1995, H.B. 2304 was enacted, which required that the Secretary of State make the Administrative Code available online free of charge. , there are 17 titles in the Code, listed below.

 Title 1: Administration
 Title 4: Agriculture
 Title 7: Banking and Securities
 Title 10: Community Development
 Title 13: Cultural Resources
 Title 16: Economic Regulation
 Title 19: Education
 Title 22: Examining Boards
 Title 25: Health Services
 Title 26: Health and Human Services
 Title 28: Insurance
 Title 30: Environmental Quality
 Title 31: Natural Resources and Conservation
 Title 34: Public Finance
 Title 37: Public Safety and Corrections
 Title 40: Social Services and Assistance
 Title 43: Transportation

References 

Texas law